French football club SC Bastia's 2009–10 season. Finished 20th place in league and relegated to Championnat National. Top scorer of the season, including 14 goals in 14 league matches have been Pierre-Yves André. Was eliminated to Coupe de France 7. round, the Coupe de la Ligue was able to be among the 1. tour.

Transfers

In

Out

Squad

Ligue 2

League table

Results summary

Results by round

Matches

Coupe de France

Coupe de la Ligue

Statistics

Top scorers

League top assists

References 

SC Bastia seasons
Bastia